Russell Watkinson (born 3 December 1977) is an English former footballer who played as a midfielder. Whilst at Southampton, Watkinson made two substitute appearances in the Premier League in games against Tottenham Hotspur and Middlesbrough.

References

Since 1888... The Searchable Premiership and Football League Player Database (subscription required)

1977 births
Living people
English footballers
Association football midfielders
Premier League players
Woking F.C. players
Southampton F.C. players
Millwall F.C. players
Aldershot Town F.C. players
Farnborough F.C. players
Fleet Town F.C. players